Vijetha is a 2018 Indian Telugu-language action drama film, starring Kalyaan Dhev, Murali Sharma and Malavika Nair. Rakesh Shashi is the director, and Sai Korrapati and Rajani Korrapati are the producers. The film was released on 12 July 2018. Dhev won SIIMA Award for Best Male Debut – Telugu at the 8th SIIMA for his role in the film.

Plot 
Ram, a careless youth, grows up oblivious to the sacrifices his father makes in order to fulfil all his desires.He falls in love with the girl living next door to him,when he sees her making dosa in someone else's store to win a challenge.However, a major incident motivates him to change his ways of living and respect his father's hardwork.

Cast 

 Kalyaan Dhev as Ram
 Malavika Nair as Chaithra 
 Murali Sharma as K. Sridhar Rao, Ram's father
 Nassar as K. V. Raghunathan, A photographer 
 Tanikella Bharani as Mohan Prasad, K. Sridhar Rao's friend
 Kalyani Natarajan as Lakshmi, Ram's mother
 Pragathi as Chaithra's mother
 Sivannarayana as K. Sridhar Rao's friend
 Jayaprakash as Company Chairman
 Rajiv Kanakala as Rajiv, Chairman's 1st son
 Gayatri Bhargavi as chairman's daughter-in-law
 Aadarsh Balakrishna as Kiran, chairman's 2nd son
 Surya Sreenivas as chairman's third son/Ram's brother-in-law
 Noel Sean as Ram's friend
 Kireeti Damaraju as Ram's friend
 Snigdha as company manager
 Satyam Rajesh as Chaithra's uncle
 Prudhvi Raj as Police SI
 Sanjay Reddy as a businessman

Soundtrack 

Music was composed by Harshavardhan Rameshwar, and released on Vel Records company.

References

External links

2018 films
2010s Telugu-language films
Vaaraahi Chalana Chitram films